Ziyad Larkeche (born 19 September 2002) is a French professional footballer who plays for Barnsley, on loan from Fulham, as a left-back.

Club career
Born in Paris, Larkeche played youth football with Paris Saint-Germain and Fulham, before on loan to Barnsley in September 2022. He made his senior debut on 20 September 2022 in the EFL Trophy, and was praised for his performance by assistant head coach Martin Paterson, after setting up one goal before later scoring a free kick.

International career
Born in France, Larkeche is of Algerian descent. He is a French youth international, having played up to the France U20s.

Career statistics

References

2002 births
Living people
Footballers from Paris
French footballers
France youth international footballers
French sportspeople of Algerian descent
Paris Saint-Germain F.C. players
Fulham F.C. players
Barnsley F.C. players
English Football League players
Association football fullbacks
French expatriate footballers
French expatriates in England
Expatriate footballers in England